Enzo Bardeli (born 11 April 2001) is a French professional footballer who plays as a midfielder for  club Dunkerque.

Career
A youth product of Lille since the age of 10, Bardeli began his senior team with their reserves. He transferred to Dunkerque in 2021, signing his first professional contract on 2 March 2022. He made his professional debut with Dunkerque in a 3–0 Ligue 2 loss to Niort, coming on as a late sub in the 88th minute.

References

External links
 
 Ligue 2 Profile

2001 births
Living people
Sportspeople from Dunkirk
French footballers
USL Dunkerque players
Association football midfielders
Ligue 2 players
Championnat National 3 players
Footballers from Hauts-de-France